Pteroporus antiquus is a species of beetle in the family Dytiscidae, the only species in the genus Pteroporus.

References

Dytiscidae